Leon Rose (born 1961) is an American basketball executive, attorney and sports agent. He serves as president of the New York Knicks of the National Basketball Association (NBA). As a sports agent, Rose represented a number of prominent NBA players, including Allen Iverson and LeBron James.

Early life
Rose grew up in Cherry Hill, New Jersey and attended Cherry Hill High School East, where he played basketball and was later inducted into the school's hall of fame. Rose graduated from Dickinson College, where he played on the basketball team, and earned his J.D. degree at Temple University Beasley School of Law. He was inducted into the Philadelphia Jewish Sports Hall of Fame in 2011.

Sports agent career
Rose represented LeBron James from 2005 until 2012, when James left to join Klutch Sports, led by Rich Paul, who worked under Rose at CAA. Rose and fellow CAA agent Henry Thomas, who at the time represented the Heat's Dwyane Wade and Chris Bosh, worked together to bring the three players together on the Miami Heat in 2010. Rose negotiated a four-year deal for James with Miami. He had previously negotiated a 2006 extension for James with the Cleveland Cavaliers.

Executive career
On March 2, 2020, Rose was named president of the New York Knicks of the National Basketball Association (NBA).

Clients
Rose's previous and current clients include:

Carmelo Anthony, forward, Last NBA team: Los Angeles Lakers
Renaldo Balkman, forward, Last NBA team: New York Knicks, 2010
Andrea Bargnani, forward/center, Last NBA team: Brooklyn Nets
Devin Booker, guard, Phoenix Suns
Omri Casspi, forward, Memphis Grizzlies
Mardy Collins, guard, Last NBA team: Los Angeles Clippers, 2010
Eddy Curry, center, Last NBA team: Dallas Mavericks, 2012
DeSagana Diop, center, Last NBA team: Charlotte Bobcats, 2013
Joel Embiid, center, Philadelphia 76ers
Jonny Flynn, guard, Last NBA team: Portland Trail Blazers, 2010
Richard Hamilton, guard, Retired
Allen Iverson, guard, Retired
LeBron James, forward, Los Angeles Lakers
Eddie Jones, guard, retired
Michael Kidd-Gilchrist, forward, Dallas Mavericks
Aaron McKie, guard, retired
Victor Oladipo, guard, Miami Heat
Chris Paul, guard, Phoenix Suns
P.J. Tucker, guard, Philadelphia 76ers
J.R. Smith, guard, Los Angeles Lakers, 2020
Kenny "Special K" Soll, Harlem Globetrotters
Rodney Stuckey, guard, Retired
Jonas Valančiūnas, center, New Orleans Pelicans
Dajuan Wagner, guard, Prokom Trefl Sopot

See also 
 List of National Basketball Association team presidents

References

1960s births
Living people
20th-century American Jews
American sports agents
Cherry Hill High School East alumni
Dickinson Red Devils men's basketball players
New York Knicks executives
Pennsylvania lawyers
People from Cherry Hill, New Jersey
Sportspeople from the Delaware Valley
Temple University Beasley School of Law alumni
21st-century American Jews